Gladwyn Kingsley Noble (September 20, 1894 – December 9, 1940) was an American zoologist who served as the head curator for the Department of Herpetology and the Department of Experimental Biology at the American Museum of Natural History. Noble received bachelor's and master's degrees from Harvard University in 1917 and 1918, respectively, and a Ph.D. from Columbia University in 1922.  He joined the herpetology department in 1922 as a research assistant and assistant curator in 1917, and became the chairman of the department in 1924. He later formed the Department of Experimental Biology in 1928, and  served as the chairman of both departments until his death on December 9, 1940, from a streptococcal throat infection.

Noble is the taxon author of 20 new species of reptiles. A species of lizard, Anolis noblei, is named in his honor. Also, a subspecies of lizard, Sphaerodactylus darlingtoni noblei, is named in his honor.

Wife
Noble was married to Ruth Cosby. The couple had two sons, G. Kingsley Noble Jr. and Alan Noble. Ruth Crosby Noble died March 15, 1988, at the Allendale (New Jersey) Nursing Home, where she lived. At the time of her death, she was 91 years old. Ruth Noble wrote The Nature of the Beast, a book on animal behavior based on research by her husband.

Parents 
Gladwyn Kingsley Noble's father was Gilbert Clifford Noble, one of the founders of what would become Barnes & Noble bookstores and publishing house. Gilbert Clifford Noble joined the Arthur Hinds & Company firm in 1886 after graduating from Harvard College. In 1894, he was made a partner and the name of the company was changed to Hinds & Noble. In 1917, Gilbert bought out Hinds and entered into a partnership with William Barnes and the company was changed to Barnes & Noble. In 1930, Gilbert sold his share of the company to John Wilcox Barnes.

Noble's mother was Elizabeth Adams. She was a member of the first graduating class at Vassar College.

Children
Gladwyn Kingsley Noble Jr. is often confused with his famous father, the biologist, but the son was known in the field of anthropology. G. Kingsley Noble Jr. of Portola Valley, California, died 20 July 1994 at the age of 70, of a heart attack. A native of New York, he earned his bachelor's degree from Washington and Lee University in 1948 and received his doctorate in 1962 from Columbia University with the acceptance of his dissertation thesis, "Proto-Arawakan and its descendants".  The thesis was subsequently published in book form in 1966. He was a faculty member in linguistics and anthropology at San Jose State University from 1963 to 1982. After his retirement, he earned a master of fine arts degree from the San Francisco Art Institute. His photographs were often exhibited at the Gallery House in Palo Alto. He is survived by two sons, Jonathan and Craigan Noble. He authored several anthropological articles.

Publications
G.K. Noble and G.C. Klingel (August 11, 1932), American Museum Novitates number 549: "The Reptiles of Great Inagua Island, British West Indies"

Publications by his son
G. Kingsley Noble, Jr. (1974), Ethnology: The Bolivian Aymara. HANS C. BUECHLER and JUDITH-MARIA BUECHLER. American Anthropologist, 76: 148–149. doi: 10.1525/aa.1974.76.1.02a00760
G. Kingsley Noble, Jr. (1971), Man's Many Voices: Language in Its Cultural Context. ROBBINS BURLING. American Anthropologist, 73: 1378–1379. doi: 10.1525/aa.1971.73.6.02a00710
G. Kingsley Noble, Jr. Proto-Arawakan and its descendants,  Bloomington : Indiana University, 1965. Series:	International journal of American linguistics, v. 31, no. 3, pt. 2.; Publication of the Indiana University Research Center in Anthropology, Folklore, and Linguistics, 38

See also

References

American herpetologists
American taxonomists
1894 births
1940 deaths
People associated with the American Museum of Natural History
Columbia University alumni
Harvard University alumni
Scientists from New York (state)
20th-century American zoologists